Mynampati is a given name and surname. Notable people with the name include:

Mynampati Bhaskar, writer and a journalist from Andhra Pradesh
Ram Mynampati, Indian business executive
Sreerama Chandra Mynampati, Indian singer

Indian surnames